Kerr Point is a point  southeast of Georges Point, on the east side of Rongé Island, off the west coast of Graham Land, Antarctica. It was charted by the Belgian Antarctic Expedition under Gerlache, 1897–99, and was named by the UK Antarctic Place-Names Committee in 1960 for Adam J. Kerr, Second Officer of RRS Shackleton, who sounded the adjacent Errera Channel in 1956–57.

References

Headlands of Graham Land
Danco Coast